The Invader is a 2011 Belgian drama film written and directed by Nicolas Provost. Dieudonné Kabongo received a Magritte Award nomination for Best Supporting Actor. The film was shown at several international film festivals in 2011, including the Toronto International Film Festival; was nominated for several awards, including Best Production Design at the 2013 Magritte Award; and winner of the Best Original Music and Sound Design at the 2011 Flanders International Film Festival Ghent.

Plot
After Amadou, an illegal African immigrant, arrives in Brussels seeking a better life, his illusions of Europe are quickly shattered. He is exploited and consumed with the drudgery of daily existence, until he meets Agnès, a beautiful business woman, onto whom he projects his hopes and desires. His charisma and persistence seduces Agnès, who quickly wearies of his emotional burdens. When she severs all ties with Amadou, he sinks into destruction and violence.

Cast
Toni d'Antonio as Le taxi
Laurence César as Caissière épicerie
John Flanders as Dr. Charles de Yael
Jean-Louis Froment as L'homme qui achète le bois
Dieudonné Kabongo as Omar
James Kazama as Liong Bing
Hannelore Knuts as the naturist
Katsuko Nakamura as L'amie d'Omar
Ken Kelountang Ndiaye as Sioka (as Ken N'Diaye)
Serge Riaboukine as Jean-Pierre, le passeur
Stefania Rocca as Agnès de Yael
Isaka Sawadogo as Amadou / Obama
Tibo Vandenborre as Kris
Bernard Van Vooren as Le clochard
Carole Weyers as Kate

References

External links
 

2011 drama films
Georges Delerue Award winners
Belgian drama films